Trinity Park may refer to:

 Trinity Park, Queensland, a suburb of Cairns, Australia
 Trinity Park, Texas, an unincorporated community in the United States
 Trinity Historic District, a historic neighborhood in Durham, North Carolina